Amburana cearensis (Portuguese common names; ambaúrana, amburana, amburana de cheiro, angelim, baru, cabocla, cerejeira rajada, cumaré, cumaru, cumaru de cheiro, cumaru do ceará, cumbaru das caatingas, emburana, emburana de cheiro, imburana, imburana brava, imburana cheirosa, imburana de cheiro, louro ingá, umburana, umburana lisa, umburana macho, umburana vermelha, umburana de cheiro, umburana-de-cheiro, umburana do cheiro: Spanish common names; ishpingo, roble criollo) is a species of timber tree in the family Fabaceae. This plant is native to Argentina, Bolivia, Brazil, Paraguay, and Peru. It is threatened by habitat loss.

References

Amburaneae
Trees of South America
Endangered plants
Trees of Peru
Taxonomy articles created by Polbot